The Beasts is a 2022 thriller film directed by Rodrigo Sorogoyen, who co-wrote the screenplay with Isabel Peña. It stars Denis Ménochet, Marina Foïs, Luis Zahera, and Diego Anido. A Spanish-French co-production, it was shot in Galician, French and Spanish.

Inspired by real events involving a Dutch couple in Santoalla, the plot follows a French couple (Ménochet and Foïs) settled in the Galician countryside, exploring issues of xenophobia and escalating hostility between neighbors buoyed by a conflict vis-à-vis a wind farm project, arriving to a point of no return.

The film made its world premiere at the 75th Cannes Film Festival on 26 May 2022, with a festival run that also included screenings in San Sebastián, Tokyo and Chicago. It was released theatrically in France on 20 July 2022 and in Spain on 11 November 2022.

The Beasts earned 17 nominations to the 37th Goya Awards, winning in 9 categories, including Best Film, Director, Original Screenplay, and Leading Actor (Ménochet). It also won the César Award for Best Foreign Film.

Plot 
The plot is loosely inspired by real events that took place in Santoalla, a semi-abandoned hamlet of Petín, from 2010 to 2014. Set in the Galician countryside, it follows a French couple (Antoine and Olga Denis) settled in a small village seeking to connect with nature, growing and selling their own eco-friendly crops and rehabilitating abandoned properties so they can be reinhabited. However their presence arouses hostility and downright violence from a couple of neighbors, the brothers Xan (an inflexible man used to interacting under a might makes right worldview) and Loren (with reduced mental capacity in the wake of an accident he suffered when he was young), pitted against the French at the opposing side of a dispute pertaining the sale of land to a wind energy company, as Antoine and Olga are opposed to the deal and block it, whilst Xan wants the money in order to leave the countryside and have a chance for a better life for him and his family.

Cast

Production 
The screenplay was penned by Sorogoyen's long-time collaborator Isabel Peña and Sorogoyen himself. The production crew also features other Sorogoyen's recurring collaborators (such as Olivier Arson as composer, Alex de Pablo as director of cinematography and Alberto del Campo as film editor).

Sorogoyen reported that he would shoot the film "as a western". Filming began on 16 September 2021 and wrapped on 13 December 2021. Shooting locations included El Bierzo and inland Galicia.

Release 
The Beasts debuted at the 75th Cannes Film Festival on 26 May 2022, screened out of competition in the Cannes Première section. Distributed by Le Pacte, the film opened in French theatres on 20 July 2022. It also screened at the 70th San Sebastián International Film Festival in September 2022, as part of the 'Pearls' film slate. It was also selected in the 35th Tokyo International Film Festival's main slate (for its Asian premiere). Distributed by A Contracorriente, it was theatrically released in Spain on 11 November 2022. By the end of the year, it had grossed €3.6 million at the Spanish box office, the 6th highest-grossing Spanish film overall.

Latido Films licensed US rights on the film to Greenwich Entertainment. UK/Ireland distributor Curzon also nabbed rights to the film.

Reception

Critical reception 
According to the review aggregation website Rotten Tomatoes, The Beasts has a 100% approval rating based on 17 reviews from critics, with an average rating of 8.4/10.

Wendy Ide of ScreenDaily deemed the film to be "a terrific psychological thriller and a brooding, muscular piece of filmmaking which makes the most of both the Galician backdrop and the imposing physicality of Menochet and, as his nemesis Xan, the remarkable Luis Zahera.

Manu Yáñez of Fotogramas rated the film 3 out of 5 stars, writing that Sorogoyen "shows his talent for generating situations charged with blatant hostility", assessing "the way Sorogoyen manages the tempo of each scene" to be the best about the film, while drawing out the "grotesque portrait of the inhabitants of rural Galicia", close to caricature, as the worst thing about it.

Philipp Engel of Cinemanía rated the film 4½ stars, pointing out at two sequence shots working in a mirror-like fashion (respectively concerning Menochet, Zahera and Anido, and Foïs and Colomb) as the heart of the film, underscoring The Beasts to be "a beastly film, although not entirely rounded, due to [featuring] a complexity that moves it away from the purity of the western".

Raquel Hernández Luján of HobbyConsolas rated The Beasts with 85 points ("very good"), highlighting the tension throughout its first hour as well as the performances by Ménochet, Foïs, and Zahera as the film's standouts.

Eric Ortiz García of ScreenAnarchy assessed that the film "stands out for its accomplished sequences of mundane tension in crescendo and for the complex background of the conflict".

Marta Medina of El Confidencial rated the film 4 out of 5 stars assessing it to have its best ally in "its formal cleanliness, in its conciseness".

In August 2022, the members of the Academy of Cinematographic Arts and Sciences of Spain selected The Beasts in their shortlist of three pre-selections for their submission to the 95th Academy Awards for Best International Feature Film alongside Alcarràs and Lullaby.

Top ten lists 
The film appeared on a number of critics' top ten lists of the best European films of 2022:

In addition, it also appeared on top ten lists of the best Spanish films of 2022:

Accolades

See also 
 List of Spanish films of 2022
 List of French films of 2022
 Santoalla

References

External links 
 

2022 multilingual films
2022 thriller films
2022 Western (genre) films
2020s French films
2020s French-language films
2020s Spanish films
2020s Spanish-language films
Arcadia Motion Pictures films
Films about immigration to Spain
Films set in Galicia (Spain)
Films shot in Castile and León
Films shot in Galicia (Spain)
French multilingual films
French thriller films
Galician-language films
Spanish multilingual films
Spanish thriller films
Spanish-language French films
Environmental films
Films featuring a Best Actor Goya Award-winning performance
Best Film Goya Award winners
Caballo Films films